Haviv Ohayon (born 17 August 1998) is an Israeli footballer who plays for Hapoel Hadera on loan from Maccabi Tel Aviv.

Career
Seen as a precocious talent, Ohayon joined the Maccabi Tel Aviv senior team at the age of 17 and became their third goalkeeper behind Juan Pablo Colinas and Barak Levi. On 10 August 2015 he made his debut in a 3-0 loss to Maccabi Petah Tikva.

Following a trial with English Premier League side Watford in January 2016, Ohayon joined the club's under-23 team on loan in the following August. Meanwhile, he also extended his Maccabi Tel Aviv contract for another five years.

In 2019, he stopped playing for years due to suffering a head injury at the beach.

Trophies
Maccabi Tel Aviv
Israeli Premier League (1):  2014–15
Israel State Cup (1): 2014-15 
Toto Cup (1): 2014–15

Club career statistics

References

1998 births
Living people
Israeli footballers
Israeli Jews
Israeli Premier League players
Maccabi Tel Aviv F.C. players
Watford F.C. players
Hapoel Hadera F.C. players
Footballers from Petah Tikva
Association football goalkeepers
Israeli expatriate footballers
Expatriate footballers in England
Israeli expatriate sportspeople in England